New York's 105th State Assembly district is one of the 150 districts in the New York State Assembly. It has been represented by Republican Anil Beephan Jr. since 2023, succeeding Kieran Lalor.

Geography
District 105 is in Dutchess County. It contains the towns of Beekman, Dover, East Fishkill, Fishkill, La Grange, Pawling, Union Vale, Wappinger, and Washington.

Recent election results

2022

2020

2018

2016

2014

2012

References

105
Dutchess County, New York